The Chalk Mountains are a mountain range in Humboldt County, California.

References 

Mountain ranges of Northern California
Mountain ranges of Humboldt County, California